The Apold is a left tributary of the river Secaș in Romania. It discharges into the Secaș in Apoldu de Jos.

References

Rivers of Romania
Rivers of Sibiu County